Miłkowice  is a village (former town) in Legnica County, Lower Silesian Voivodeship, in south-western Poland. It is the seat of the administrative district (gmina) called Gmina Miłkowice.

The village has a population of 2,000.

References

Villages in Legnica County